The Chief Justice of Victoria is the senior judge of the Supreme Court of Victoria and the highest ranking judicial officer in the Australian state of Victoria. The Chief Justice is both the judicial head of the Supreme Court as well as the administrative head. They are responsible for arranging the business of the court and establishing its rules and procedures.

The current Chief Justice is Anne Ferguson, who was appointed by Governor Linda Dessau to succeed Marilyn Warren. Ferguson's term began on 2 October 2017.

List of chief justices of Victoria

See also
 Judiciary of Australia
 Supreme Court of Victoria

References

 
Lists of judges of Australian superior courts